Nethiyadi is a 1989 Indian Tamil-language comedy drama film written and directed by Pandiarajan. The film stars Pandiarajan, Vaishnavi, Janagaraj, Senthil, and Shanmugasundari.

Plot

Cast

Soundtrack 
All songs were written by Vaali, Vairamuthu, Pulavar Mari, Rajaraja Chozhan, Satta Muthan and composed by Pandiarajan.

Reception 
Kalki wrote .

References

External links 
 

1980s Tamil-language films
Indian comedy films
1989 films
1989 comedy films